Pusat Bandar (Malay for 'City Centre') is the city centre of Bandar Seri Begawan, the capital of Brunei. It is home to a number of national landmarks, important government offices, and commercial and financial establishments.

Administration 
The city centre is part of the municipal area of the capital. It is also one of the administrative villages within Mukim Kianggeh, a mukim of Brunei-Muara District, with a population of 204 in 2016. It has the postcode BA8611.

Places 

The city centre is home to several sites with historical and cultural significance, including:
 Omar Ali Saifuddien Mosque, one of the two state mosques of Brunei
 , a square where Brunei's independence from the British was proclaimed in 1984
 Yayasan Sultan Haji Hassanal Bolkiah Complex, a landmark commercial centre which overlooks Omar Ali Saifuddien Mosque
 Main Post Office
 Lapau, a royal ceremonial hall. It was where the Constitution of Brunei was promulgated in 1959, as well as Hassanal Bolkiah was crowned as the 29th and current Sultan of Brunei.
 , a former building for the Legislative Council of Brunei
 Royal Regalia Museum, which houses the regalia of the Bruneian royalty.
 Memorial Clock, a clock monument in the middle of a road intersection. The foundation was officially laid by the Tuanku Abdul Rahman, the first Yang Di-Pertuan Agong of Malaysia.
 Istana Darussalam, a former royal residence of Omar Ali Saifuddien III, the 28th Sultan of Brunei

There are several government institutions which have their headquarters in the city centre, including:
 Ministry of Home Affairs
 Syariah Court of Brunei
 Brunei History Centre, which oversees the official history of Brunei
 , which oversees the royal protocol of Brunei

References

External links 
 

Neighbourhoods in Bandar Seri Begawan
Central business districts